Anthony M. Mandile (August 14, 1946 – January 5, 2002) was an American politician who represented the 10th Middlesex District in the Massachusetts House of Representatives from 1987–1993 and again from 1995–1997. He was also a member of the Waltham City Council from 1974–1997.

References

1946 births
Politicians from Waltham, Massachusetts
2002 deaths
Democratic Party members of the Massachusetts House of Representatives
Massachusetts city council members
20th-century American politicians